Coelurosauravus (meaning "hollow lizard grandfather") is a genus of basal diapsid reptiles, known from the Late Permian of Madagascar. Like other members of the family Weigeltisauridae, members of this genus possessed long, rod-like ossifications projecting outwards from the body. These bony rods were not extensions of the ribs but were instead a feature unique to weigeltisaurids. It is believed that during life, these structures formed folding wings used for gliding flight, similar to living gliding Draco lizards.

Coelurosauravus is solely known from the type species, C. elivensis, which was named by Jean Piveteau in 1926 based on fossils from the Lower Sakamena Formation of Madagascar. The species Weigeltisaurus jaekeli from Europe was formerly considered a species of Coelurosauravus, but is now considered distinct.

History of discovery 
The only known specimens of Coelurosauravus were collected in 1907-1908 by J.-M. Colcanap, a captain of the French colonial infantry, in southwest Madagascar. The precise location is not known, but it is likely from Mount Eliva near the upstream part of the Sakamena River, a tributary of the Onilahy River. In 1926, the specimens were described by Jean Piveteau as Coelurosauravus elivensis. In 1930 Weigeltisaurus jaekeli was described from specimens Germany. This European species is now known from numerous specimens found in Germany (and one in England), of which some were very well preserved. In 1987, Weigeltisaurus jaekeli was synonymized with Coelurosauravus as a second species, Coelurosauravus jaekeli. However, a 2015 study reinstated Weigeltisaurus as a separate genus for "Coelurosauravus" jaekeli, which has been retained by subsequent authors. In 1979 Robert L. Carroll placed one of the C. elivensis specimens into the new genus and species Daedalosaurus madigascariensis, based on supposed differences with the holotype specimen, but it has subsequently been regarded as not distinct from C. elivensis.

List of specimens 

IP 1908-11-21a: Holotype of C. elivensis (Piveteau, 1926). A poorly preserved skull and partial skeleton.
 IP 1908-11-22a: A part and counterpart (IP 1908-11-23a) containing skull fragments and the anterior half of a skeleton.
 IP 1908-5-2: Holotype of Daedalosaurus madagascariensis (Carroll, 1978). A part and counterpart (IP 1908-5-2b) of a partial skeleton including skull pieces and gliding structures.

Description 
The skull of Coelurosauravus is the smallest of the weigeltisaurids, with a mature skull length of 3.5 cm around half those of other weigeltisaurids. Like other weigeltisaurids, the skull bones are covered in cranial ornamentation, consisting of low tubercles and spikes, including a horned frill present on the squamosal bone. In contrast to Weigeltisaurus, only tubercles, rather than spikes, are present on the parietal bone, which is also shared with Glaurung. The teeth are simple and conical in shape and packed into a dense row. The teeth sequentially decrease in size posteriorly. Compared to Weigeltisaurus, Coelourosauravus has a shorter neck and longer thorax (which is also flattened), and like other weigeltisaurids the tail is elongate. Like other weigeltisaurdis, the penultimate phalanges are elongated, which in combination with their recurved unguals indicative of claws were likely an adaption to cling to tree bark. At least 29 pairs of long, elongate rod-shaped bones project from the sides of the body, dubbed "patagials". These are roughtly equally spaced along the trunk. The first nine patagials show a rapid increase in size, with the ninth being the longest of all of the patagials, with the remaining pairs gradually decreasing in size posteriorly.

Paleobiology 
Though no stomach contents have been found, Coelurosauravus and other weigeltisaurds have been interpreted as arboreal insectivores. The simple conical teeth of Coelurosauravus are well adapted to the piercing of arthropod cuticle. The cranial ornamentation may have served a display purpose.

Gliding 
The rods originate from the lower-lateral surface of the body. The furling and unfurling of the gliding membrane were likely controlled by the abdominal muscles. Preserved fossils of Weigeltisaurus show that the bony rods had a high degree of flexiiblity, similar to the ribs of living gliding lizards. Due to the low-wing configuration, it is likely that the gliding surface was angled upwards to increase stability. In living gliding lizards, it has been found that the forelimbs grab hold of the membrane during flight, suggesting that the forelimbs are used to control the patagium while in flight. Similar behaviour has been proposed for weigeltisaurids. This is supported the presence of an additional phalange in the fourth digit of the hands of weigeltisaurids, which would have allowed them to more effectively grasp the wing. In a 2011 study comparing Coelurosauravus elivensis and other extinct gliding reptiles to modern Draco species, Coelurosauravus was found to be a less efficient glider than modern Draco due to its larger body size, with a wing loading around 107.9 N/m2, 4.5 times than higher than Draco, with a substantial drop in height per glide, corresponding with a steep descent angle of more than 45 degrees. However, some authors have considered that the unique configuration and aspect ratio of the wings of weigeltisaurids means that the comparison needs to be tested experimentally.

Paleoenvironment 
The Lower Sakamamena Formation was deposited in a wetland environment situated within a North-South orientated rift valley, perhaps similar to Lake Tanganyika. The climate at the time of deposition was temperate, warm, and humid, with seasonal rainfall and possible monsoons Flora from the formation includes the equisetalean Schizoneura, the glossopterid gymnosperm Glossopteris, and seed fern Lepidopteris. Other vertebrates known from the Lower Sakamena Formation include the palaeoniscoid fish Atherstonia, the procolophonid parareptile Barasaurus, the neodiapsids Hovasaurus, Claudiosaurus, Thadeosaurus, and Acerodontosaurus, fragments of rhinesuchid temnospondyls, an indeterminate theriodont therapsid and the dicynodont Oudenodon.

See also 

 Draco volans
 Kuehneosaurus
 Sharovipteryx

References

Further reading 
 Parker, Steve. Dinosaurus: the complete guide to dinosaurs. Firefly Books Inc, 2003. Pg. 98
 Lambert D, Naish D, and Wyse E (2001) Encyclopedia of Dinosaurs and Prehistoric Life, p. 77, Dorling Kindersley Limited, London. 

Prehistoric reptile genera
Prehistoric neodiapsids
Lopingian reptiles of Africa
Lopingian genera
Fossils of Madagascar
Fossil taxa described in 1926